Northcoast Preparatory Academy, formerly known as Northcoast Preparatory and Performing Arts Academy and abbreviated as NPA, is an independent public charter high school located in Arcata, California. It is currently the top ranked high school in Humboldt County, California.

History
NPA was founded in 2000 as the high school branch of the Northcoast Charter Network, providing a college preparatory program with an emphasis on the arts and sciences. In August, 2004 the International Baccalaureate Organization granted NPA status as an IB World School offering the IB Diploma Programme.

In 2009, NPA was ranked as the 30th top public high school in the United States by Newsweek Magazine.

In 2010, NPA was ranked as the 23rd top public high school in the United States by Newsweek Magazine.

In 2011, NPA was ranked as the 12th top public high school in the United States by The Washington Post.

In 2018, NPA was ranked as the 28th most Challenging high school in the United States by The Washington Post, and 96% of students passed at least one college-level exam during their high school career.

In 2016, the NPA middle school was opened on a different campus. It is currently being integrated into the IB Middle Years Programme.

Curriculum
The school's curriculum focuses on college preparation and the IB Diploma Programme, plus a broad range of opportunities including: 
International travel
Music
Drama
Art
Community service
Analytical and creative writing
Research papers

According to the IB, NPA offers:

IB Group 1 subjects:
 English A lit

IB Group 2 subjects:
 French B
 Spanish AB

IB Group 3 subjects:
 History
 Philosophy

IB Group 4 subjects:
 Biology 
 Physics

IB Group 5 subjects:
 Mathematical Studies SL
 Mathematics SL

IB Group 6 subjects:
 Dance 
 Music
 Theater 
 Visual Arts

IB Diploma Programme Courses:
 Theory of Knowledge

NPA also offers 4 AP classes: AP  language and composition, AP literature and composition, AP chemistry, and AP music theory.

The school newspaper, the Heron Herald, is one of the electives students can choose to take. The current co-editors are juniors Omega Gaskill and Autumn Wright.

The school's program also permits students to take advantage of courses taught at College of the Redwoods, the local 2-year college, and at Humboldt State University.

Each year there are at least two major dramatic productions, which are produced first locally at Gist Theater at HSU and then sometimes performed in the countries to which students travel that year.

Demographics

According to Niche, 83% of the 139 students are white, 6.8% are Asian American, 5.7% are Hispanic, 1.7% are multiracial, 1.1% are African American, 1.1% are Native American and 0.6% are Pacific Islanders. 61% of students are female and 39% are male, with 34% of students coming from low-income families.

Athletics
Sports at NPA include Men and Women's Varsity Tennis, Co-Ed Basketball, and Co-Ed Cross Country. Tennis is the most competitive, with both teams playing regularly in the H-DN league. The school is planning to transition the rest of the sports to the H-DN league in the upcoming years.

Board of Directors
The current members of the board are:
Jim Hilton
Robert Ziemer, president
Danise Tomlin
Rebecca Marie Hall
Kathy O'Shea
Janice Lorenzo, HCOE Representative

References

External links
 Official website

 International Baccalaureate school profile

High schools in Humboldt County, California
Charter high schools in California
International Baccalaureate schools in California
2000 establishments in California